Bruce Bricknell (11 July 1935 – 16 October 1982) was a New Zealand cricket umpire. He stood in one Test match, New Zealand vs. Australia, in 1982 and two ODI games between 1981 and 1982.

See also
 List of Test cricket umpires
 List of One Day International cricket umpires
 Australian cricket team in New Zealand in 1981–82

References

1935 births
1982 deaths
Sportspeople from Wellington City
New Zealand Test cricket umpires
New Zealand One Day International cricket umpires